Linos is a masculine given name. Notable people with the name include:

 Linos Chalwe (born 1980), Zambian footballer
 Linos Chrysikopoulos (born 1992), Greek basketball player
 Linos Makwaza (born 1965), Zambian footballer

Masculine given names